Glenn William Robinson (born October 20, 1951) is a former American football defensive end and linebacker who played for the Baltimore Colts and Tampa Bay Buccaneers of the National Football League (NFL) from 1975 to 1977. He attended Thomas Jefferson High School in Dallas, Navarro Junior College and Oklahoma State University before being drafted by the Colts in the third round (57th overall) of the 1974 NFL Draft.

References

1951 births
Living people
Sportspeople from Killeen, Texas
Players of American football from Dallas
American football defensive ends
American football linebackers
Thomas Jefferson High School (Dallas) alumni
Oklahoma State Cowboys football players
Baltimore Colts players
Tampa Bay Buccaneers players